Iridomyrmex obscurans is an extinct species of ant in the subfamily Dolichoderinae. Described by Frank Carpenter in 1930, the fossil was discovered in the United States, but unfortunately nothing much is known about this ant.

References

†
Fossil ant taxa
Hymenoptera of North America
Fossil taxa described in 1930
Taxa named by Frank M. Carpenter